Die Welt des Islams or the International Journal for the Study of Modern Islam is an academic journal on Islam and the Muslim world published by Brill.  The journal publishes articles in three languages—English, French, and German—and its German title translates into English as "The World of Islam" and French as "Le Monde de l'Islam".  It was founded by Martin Hartmann in 1915 and is one of the oldest Western journals for the study of Islam, specialising in topics around Muslim civilisations since the late 18th century.  It has published articles by C. H. Becker, Miriam Cooke, Maxime Rodinson, Annemarie Schimmel, Bernard Lewis, Hamid Algar, and Muhammad Hamidullah.

References 

Islamic studies journals
Multilingual journals
Publications established in 1913
Brill Publishers academic journals